Les Essentiels d'Angoulême ("The Essentials of Angoulême") is a comics award chosen by the jury of the Angoulême International Comics Festival since 2007, selecting five albums from a longlist of some fifty. Subsidiary awards chosen by the same jury are the Essentiel Révélation (best first album, successor of the Angoulême International Comics Festival Prize for First Comic Book) and Essentiel Patrimoine (successor of the Angoulême International Comics Festival Prize for Inheritance).

Since 2008, the Angoulême International Comics Festival Prize Awarded by the Audience has also been renamed Essentiel FNAC-SNCF, and the Angoulême International Comics Festival Prix Jeunesse 9-12 ans has become the Essentiel Jeunesse.

Winners

External links
 2007 Winners
 2008 Winners
 2009 Winners

Angoulême International Comics Festival